Cocaine: One Man's Seduction is a 1983 American drama television film directed by Paul Wendkos, starring Dennis Weaver as a real estate agent who gets addicted to cocaine.

Plot 
Eddie Gant was once a highly successful real estate agent, the number one for over ten years, but is now struggling to sell houses. He is frustrated that the company's top salesman is now Tad Voss, a young snob. Eddie is pressured into selling family houses, considered a dead market, and wants to break out but does not know how. When his boss Dan Hatten does not make him partner as promised, Eddie suffers a major setback and finds solace with cocaine, arranged through his business friends Robin Barstowe and Bruce Neumann.

Through using cocaine, he feels on top of the world, and finds the confidence to act like a top salesman again. He is given the opportunity to try and sell a luxury home, but the potential buyer, Mrs. Marchais, is not impressed and leaves quickly. He decides that his only way to the top is through using cocaine and starts to do it more regularly, finding success. He buys a new car and wardrobe, and at first his wife Barbara is enthusiastic. He even wants to meet halfway with his teenage son Buddy, who feels pressured by his dad to enroll in law school. As Eddie is making more and more late nights, Barbara quickly starts to complain that she never sees him anymore.

Simultaneously, Mort Broome, an old friend, tries to commit suicide by shooting himself with a rifle and blames the incident on cocaine use. Eddie is shocked but continues his path, despite getting frequent headaches. He purchases a large amount of the drugs from Bruce and spirals downward. He estranges himself from his family and nearly begins an affair with Robin, who makes clear to him that they only connect through drugs and that he should stop using. Meanwhile, Mort detects the symptoms of cocaine abuse and confronts his friend, but Eddie claims to be nothing more than a casual user.

Eventually, Buddy finds his father's stash in his shaving equipment, and Barbara later finds some of the drugs in Buddy's sweatshirt. Pressured by Barbara, Eddie confronts his son with the drugs. Buddy doesn't reveal the truth but does not hide his disgust with his father. Eddie promises Buddy that he has quit cold turkey, but when a major sale opportunity comes up, he steals Buddy's college money to purchase cocaine from Bruce. Bruce, however, is arrested and charged with drug possession with the intention to sell before he can get to him. He forces himself into Robin’s place and violently steals her drugs which had been thrown in the trash. Upon meeting with existing clients, Eddie suffers from an overdose. He survives, but is sentenced by a judge for two years on probation and a mandatory drug rehabilitation program. Embarrassed by the situation, he perceives it as a wake-up call and vows to better his life, supported by the love of his family.

Cast

External links

1983 television films
1983 films
1983 drama films
1980s American films
1980s English-language films
American drama television films
Films about cocaine
Films about salespeople
Films directed by Paul Wendkos
Films scored by Brad Fiedel
NBC network original films